Indosolar Limited is an Indian photovoltaic cell and solar panel manufacturer. It is presently under the CORPORATE INSOLVANCY RESOLUTION PROCESS (CIRP). It is the largest PV cell manufacturer in India by capacity.

Robin Garments Private Limited was incorporated under the Companies Act on 8 April 2005, by Indian entrepreneur Bhushan Kumar Gupta. Gupta had previously founded Phoenix Lamps Ltd., an automotive halogen lamp manufacturer. On 2 July 2008, shareholders decided to rename the company to Robin Solar Private Limited to reflect the company presence in the solar business. The Registrar of Companies (RoC) granted a new certificate of incorporation on 21 July 2008. On 16 September 2009, the Delhi High Court ordered the amalgamation of the two incorporated companies. Per the terms of the amalgamation, the company's status was changed from a private limited company to a public limited company, and it was renamed Indosolar Limited. The RoC granted new certificates of incorporation confirming the new status and name on 12 October and 30 October 2009 respectively.

On 13 June 2014, Indosolar secured a contract with Azure Power to supply 60 MW of solar power. This was the single largest solar contract of India's National Solar Mission.

References

See also
Azure Power
Solar power in India

Photovoltaics manufacturers
Manufacturing companies based in Delhi
Indian companies established in 2005
Companies based in New Delhi
Solar energy companies of India
Indian brands
2005 establishments in Delhi
Manufacturing companies established in 2005
Energy companies established in 2005
Companies listed on the National Stock Exchange of India
Companies listed on the Bombay Stock Exchange